The Tash-Kömür Hydro Power Plant is a hydroelectric power plant on the river Naryn in Tash-Kömür, Kyrgyzstan. Completed between 1985 and 1987, it is one of the three hydro power plants on the river Naryn near Tash-Kömür, 14 km upstream from the Shamaldy-Say Hydroelectric Power Station. It has 3 individual turbines with a nominal output of around 150 MW and a total nominal capacity of 450 MW.

References

Hydroelectric power stations in Kyrgyzstan
Dams in Kyrgyzstan
Hydroelectric power stations built in the Soviet Union
Dams completed in 1987
Dams on the Naryn River